The Best of L'Arc-en-Ciel 1998–2000 is a compilation album released by L'Arc-en-Ciel on March 19, 2003, simultaneously with The Best of L'Arc-en-Ciel 1994–1998 and The Best of L'Arc-en-Ciel C/W. It reached number four on the Oricon Albums Chart and charted for 16 weeks.

Track listing

Credits
 Hyde – vocals
 Ken – guitar, keyboards (on some tracks) 
 Tetsu – bass guitar, backing vocals, keyboards (on some tracks)
 Yukihiro – drums

Charts

References

2003 greatest hits albums
L'Arc-en-Ciel albums

ja:The Best of L'Arc〜en〜Ciel#1998-2000